ICC World Cricket League Division Four forms part of the World Cricket League (WCL) system. Like all other divisions, WCL Division Four is contested as a standalone tournament rather than as an actual league.

The inaugural Division Four tournament was held in 2008, hosted by Tanzania. Subsequent tournaments have been held in 2010 (in Italy), 2012 (in Malaysia), 2014 (in Singapore), and 2016 (in the United States). Both the number of teams (six) and tournament format (round-robin followed by playoffs) have remained unchanged between editions. Because the WCL operates on a system of promotion and relegation, teams generally only participate in one or two Division Four tournaments before being either promoted to Division Three or relegated to Division Five. In total, sixteen teams have played in at least one Division Four tournament. Afghanistan and Hong Kong, the inaugural Division Four finalists, have gone on to much greater success, both currently holding One Day International (ODI) status.

Results

Performance by team
Legend
 – Champions
 – Runners-up
 – Third place
Q – Qualified
    — Hosts

 Note: at every edition of the tournament, the teams finishing first and second have been promoted to Division Three, and the teams finishing fifth and sixth have been relegated to Division Five.

Player statistics

References

Division 4